Antonio Watson (born 11 September 2001) is a Jamaican sprinter. In 2017, he won the gold medal in the boys' 400 metres event at the 2017 World Youth Championships in Athletics held in Nairobi, Kenya.

In 2018, he won the silver medal in the boys' 200 metres event at the 2018 Summer Youth Olympics held in Buenos Aires, Argentina. He won the 200 m bronze medal and the gold in the 4x100 relay in the 2021 NACAC U23 Championships.

References

External links 
 

Living people
2001 births
Place of birth missing (living people)
Jamaican male sprinters
Athletes (track and field) at the 2018 Summer Youth Olympics
World Youth Championships in Athletics winners
21st-century Jamaican people